The Supreme Court is the highest court of law in the Republic of the Marshall Islands. It has final authority of all cases brought before it. It consists of a Chief Justice and two associate justices.

The Chief Justice is Daniel N. Cadra. Chief Justices are appointed for ten-year terms.

Chief Justices

References

Law of the Marshall Islands
Marshall Islands